= Seminarium =

Seminarium, especially when translating from other languages, may refer to:

- Seminary
- Seminar
